Dendrocnide meyeniana or the poisonous wood nettle is a species of tree in the family Urticaceae, native to the thickets and secondary forests of Taiwan and the Philippines. The specific epithet meyeniana comes from Meiyuan/眉原, a place name in Nantou County, central Taiwan. Dendrocnide meyeniana is commonly referred to as the lipa tree, but more specifically lipang kalabaw or, more rarely, apariagua.  In Philippines, the plant is named bulan-bulan in the Iloilo province, and other areas with Bisayan languages.

The official Chinese name of Dendrocnide meyeniana is 咬人狗 (yǎo rén gǒu, biting-people-dog) because the stinging hairs on the plant can cause people's skin pain, redness, burning or itching, which may last for several hours or even a day or two; in severe case, it may also cause skin inflammation. 咬人狗 is also the name of traditional Chinese medicine. The Paiwan, an indigenous ethnic group in Taiwan, call it Bazyuru, Bazyu, Bazyuyu or Bazyaro. 

The city of Lipa, Batangas in the Philippines is named after the lipa tree. Locals distinguish it primarily by the short irritant hairs on its twigs.

It is referred to as the lipa tree ("puno ng lipa" in Tagalog) or lipang kalabaw ("carabao lipa") to distinguish it from Fleurya interrupta, a shrub locally named lipang aso ("dog lipa"). The distinction between lipang kalabaw and lipang aso is descriptive, referring to their heights.

Medicinal importance
The poisonous wood nettle may cause acute dermatitis when the skin gets into to contact with the stinging hairs on its leaves, or other parts such as stems or inflorescences. The fruit and receptacle are edible, but the stalk is not, because it is covered with stinging hairs.The stinging hairs of D. meyeniana are short and hard to see. Although the leaves are densely covered with stinging hairs, they are invisible to the eyes.

In Philippine traditional medicine, the tree's sap is prepared as a drink for improving the production of breast milk. Its roots and leaves can also be used as a diuretic.

Gallery

References

External links

Trees of the Philippines
meyeniana
Trees of Taiwan